Muddasani Kodandaram Reddy popularly known as Prof. Kodandaram is an Indian Activist, Professor (Retd., Political Science) and a Politician. He founded the political party Telangana Jana Samithi (TJS) in March 2018. He was also the Chairman of Telangana Joint Action Committee (T-JAC), which was formed with the goal of achieving a separate Telangana state. He retired as Professor of Political Science from Osmania University in Hyderabad.

Early life

Muddasani Kodandaram was born on 5 September 1955 to M. Venkatamma and M. Janardhan Reddy, a farmer from Nennel, BELLAMPALLI (mancherial dist) in state of Telangana. His birthday aptly coincides with Teacher's Day in India. He has five sisters and a brother. He married Muddasani Susheela on 30 March 1983.

Telangana movement
In the last 35 years, Prof. Kodandaram has founded and worked with many organizations that have laid the foundation for the creation of the state of Telangana. Some notable organizations and events he was a part of were Andhra Pradesh Civil Liberties Committee (APCLC), Human Rights Forum (HRF), Center for World Solidarity (CWS), World Social Forum and Telangana Vidyavanthula Vedika (TVV). He was also appointed as  Advisor to Commissioner of Supreme Court where he worked on food security issue in India. He was also an activist on Polavaram displacement issues in Godavari District of Andhra Pradesh, India. Prof. Kodandaram was responsible for High Court issuing a stay order to State Government to temporarily halt the Polavaram project. He directly worked with many prominent Telangana activists including late Prof. Jaya Shankar. As TVV was instrumental in uniting all organizations and laying foundation for separate Telangana movement, its key member, Prof. Kodandaram, was ideal to lead the Telangana Joint Action Committee (TJAC). TJAC, formed in December 2009 with Prof. Kodandaram as its convener went on to unite all political and non-political organizations under one roof and was responsible for creation of Telangana. During Telangana movement, TJAC was responsible for some of the biggest political gatherings in history with successful programs like Sahaya Nirakarana, Million March, Vanta Vaarpu, Sakala Janula Samme, Sagara Haaram and Chal Main Hyderabad.

Telangana Jana Samithi

He started his political party, TJS Telangana Jana Samithi in March 2018

Awards
 World Peace Festival Award 2014 (Shanti Dootha Award).

References

Living people
Telangana movement
Telugu people
People from Telangana
People from Adilabad
1955 births